Daniel Kelley (born 1997 in Llanelli, South Wales) is a British computer hacker who, at the age of 16, hacked computer systems around the world over a period of years as part of a multi-million pound cybercrime spree. He would come to be described as a "prolific, skilled and cynical cyber-criminal" responsible for hacking and blackmail, who targeted companies all over the world.

Since his offending, Kelley has gone on to engage in extensive bug bounty and responsible disclosure. He has collaborated closely with CIRT teams, system administrators, website developers, and government agencies to ensure the remediation of over 3,000 web-application vulnerabilities.

Biography
Kelley was able to break into the secure systems using an £800 computer he bought in his home town Llanelli, Wales.

He was tracked down after being the target of 3 different police operations, Operation Purple Obsidian, Operation Falcon and Operation Belanos and was subsequently arrested.  Kelley was arrested when agents from the Metropolitan Police, National Crime Agency and officers from the local Dyfed Powys Police turned up at the door of his home.

In December 2016, the 22-year old at the time of his trial, pleaded guilty to 11 charges in total, including hacking with intent, six counts of blackmail, encouraging hacking, offering to supply data in connection with fraud, and possession of material for fraud.

See also
List of convicted computer criminals

References

External links
Mirror Article with Daniel Kelley
Cybersecurity Ventures Interview with Daniel Kelley
The Security Noob Interview with Daniel Kelley
Darknet Diaries Interview with Daniel Kelley

1997 births
Living people
Hackers
People from Llanelli
People convicted of cybercrime
British computer specialists